Neptun is the largest chain of consumer electronics in Albania and among the companies with the highest growth in the region. It provides retail sales of electronic products from TVs, computers, phones, home appliances, etc. With 20 stores in Albania and constantly expanding, Neptun is present in all major cities throughout the country.

See also
 List of companies of Albania

References

Albanian brands
Consumer electronics retailers